Judge Fox may refer to:

Edward Fox (judge) (1815–1881), judge of the United States District Court for the District of Maine
James Carroll Fox (1928–2019), judge of the United States District Court for the Eastern District of North Carolina
Noel Peter Fox (1910–1987), judge of the United States District Court for the Western District of Michigan

See also
Justice Fox (disambiguation)